Quirino Majorana (28 October 1871 – 31 July 1957) was an Italian experimental physicist who investigated a wide range of phenomena during his long career as professor of physics at the Universities of Rome, Turin (1916–1921), and Bologna (1921–1934).

Work
Majorana performed a long series of very sensitive gravity shielding experiments from 1918 to 1922, which have never been reproduced. Majorana's experiments determined that mercury or lead around a suspended lead sphere acted as a screen and slightly decreased the Earth's gravitational pull. No attempts have been made to reproduce his results using the same experimental techniques. Other researchers have concluded from other data that if gravitational absorption does exist, it must be at least five orders of magnitude smaller than Majorana's experiments suggest.

Critical of Albert Einstein's relativity theory, Majorana tried to disprove Einstein’s postulate on the constancy of the speed of light, but he failed, and therefore his experiments confirmed Einstein's postulate.

Majorana also confirmed Isaac Newton’s law of universal gravitation to high precision.

His later work at Bologna was influenced by correspondence with his nephew Ettore Majorana (1906–1938), another physicist.

References

Works

Bibliography

 Quirino Majorana, "Su di un fenomeno fotoelettrico constabile con gli audion," Rendiconti Accademia dei Lincei, V7, pp. 801–806 (1928).
 Quirino Majorana, "Azione della luce su sottili lamine metalliche," La Ricerca Scientifica National Research Council, V1 (1935).
 Quirino Majorana, "Agli albori dell'eletricità.  Galvani e la scienza moderna," Sapere, pp. 261–265 (Oct 1937).
 Quirino Majorana, "Ulteriori ricerche sull'azione della luce su sottili lamine metallische," Il Nuovo Cimento, V15, pp. 573–593 (1938).

20th-century Italian physicists
1871 births
1957 deaths
Academic staff of the University of Turin
Academic staff of the University of Bologna
Academic staff of the Sapienza University of Rome
Scientists from Sicily